The Fooyin University (FYU) is a private university in Daliao District, Kaohsiung, Taiwan.

Fooyin University offers programs at the undergraduate, graduate, and doctoral levels in a variety of fields, including nursing, healthcare management, food science, biotechnology, engineering, and humanities. 

The university also has a strong focus on research, with a number of research centers and institutes dedicated to topics such as biotechnology, healthcare, and traditional Chinese medicine.

History
FYU was originally established as three-year Fooyin Vocational High School of Midwifery in 1958. In 1962, it was transformed into a four-year vocational high school. In 1968, the school was approved to be a five-year Fooyin Junior College. In February 1997, it became the Fooyin Institute of Technology. The school was officially upgraded to Fooyin University on 1 August 2002.

Faculties
 College of Environment and Life Sciences
 College of Humanities and Management
 College of Medical and Health Sciences
 College of Nursing

Transportation
The university is accessible within walking distance South from Daliao Station of the Kaohsiung MRT.

See also
 List of universities in Taiwan

References

External links
 

1958 establishments in Taiwan
Educational institutions established in 1958
Private universities and colleges in Taiwan
Universities and colleges in Kaohsiung
Universities and colleges in Taiwan
Technical universities and colleges in Taiwan